Gijs is a Dutch masculine given name, which is a variant of Gijsbert, derived from the German name Gisbert.  The Gis element is derived from gisil, meaning "pledge" or "hostage". The name may refer to:

Gijs van Aardenne (1930–1995), Dutch politician
Gijs Bakker (born 1942), Dutch jewelry designer
Gijs Bosch Reitz (1860-1938), Dutch painter
Gijs Damen (born 1979), Dutch swimmer
Gijs van Hall (1904–1977), Dutch politician
Gijs Van Hoecke (born 1991), Belgian cyclist
Gijs van Heumen (born 1952), Dutch field hockey player
Gijs IJlander (born 1947), Dutch writer
Gijs Kuenen (born 1940), Dutch microbiologist
Gijs van der Leden (born 1967), Dutch water polo player
Gijs van Lennep (born 1942), Dutch esquire
Gijs Luirink (born 1983), Dutch footballer
Gijs Ronnes (born 1977), Dutch volleyball player
Gijs Scholten van Aschat (born 1959), Dutch actor
Gijs Steinmann (born 1961), Dutch footballer
Gijs Vermeulen (born 1981), Dutch rower

See also
Gijsbert

References

Dutch masculine given names